Sucre Parish may refer to:

Ecuador
Mariscal Sucre, Quito, an urban parish of Quito Canton, Pichincha, Ecuador
Sucre Parish, Guayaquil, a parish of Guayaquil

Venezuela
Sucre Parish, Caracas

Sucre Parish, Nueva Esparta, a parish of Gómez Municipality

See also
Sucre Municipality (disambiguation)